Neunkirchen)  is a municipality in the Siegen-Wittgenstein district, in North Rhine-Westphalia, Germany.

Geography
Neunkirchen lies on the river Heller, about 10 km south of Siegen.

Neighbouring communities
Neunkirchen neighbours the communities of Burbach, Wilnsdorf, Herdorf and Daaden.

Constituent communities

Neunkirchen consists of the following centres:
 Altenseelbach
 Neunkirchen
 Salchendorf
 Struthütten
 Wiederstein
 Zeppenfeld
Until 1 January 1969 all these places were independent municipalities, before they were all merged to form today's greater community of Neunkirchen.

History
Neunkirchen had its first documentary mention on 23 August 1288.

Religion
Neunkirchen has been shaped by the great influence of various Free-Church-Evangelical (freikirchlich-evangelisch) religious communities. This even, and especially, applies to the economic field, making its mark on the kind of approaches to management seen in the community. This practice works anachronistically, and for uninitiated atheists – and even for Christians of both greater denominations in Germany – it can be quite incomprehensible. Those from outside seeking jobs are well advised to make inquiries as to the leadership style to be expected here, as well as to be sure of getting the most generous possible probationary period.

Politics

Municipal council

The council's 28 seats are apportioned thus, in accordance with municipal elections held on 26 September 2004:

Note: UWG is a citizens' coalition.

Coat of arms
Neunkirchen's civic coat of arms might be described thus: Or three lozenges in bend sable.

The greater community's current arms are the same as those formerly borne by Altenseelbach before amalgamation. They were adopted as Neunkirchen's arms in 1969. The charge of the three lozenges comes from the arms borne by the Lords of Seelbach in the Middle Ages. A similar charge – in the same colours – can be seen in nearby Burbach's arms.

Partnerships
  Pausa, Saxony, since 1990
  Gainsborough, United Kingdom, friendship links since 1972; partnership since 1991
  Falkensee, Brandenburg

Economy and infrastructure

Established businesses
 Heinrich Baumgarten KG – special plant for making handles for the cookware industry
 Baumgarten automotive technics GmbH
 Schäfer Werke
 EMW Eisen- und Metallhandel
 Karl Sauer GmbH
 K. Sauer GmbH - lamps and contents
 F. WEIDT GMBH  Logistics Consulting

Literature
Otto Braun: 700 Jahre Neunkirchen. Neunkirchen 1988.

References

External links

 Neunkirchen 
 Altenseelbach 

Municipalities in North Rhine-Westphalia
Siegen-Wittgenstein